Jessie Morales, also known as El Original de la Sierra, is an American singer and rapper. He was born around in 1970's and raised in Los Angeles, California, making his debut as a singer at the age of 14. Even when he grew up listening to West Coast rap, the young artist started singing traditional Mexican music. Morales' Homenaje a Chalino Sánchez, released in June 2001 by Univision Music Group, climbed to the top on Billboard's Latin 50. He graduated from Thomas Jefferson High School.

Discography
1999 El Retén de la Sierra (First album)
2000 Cheque al portador-Los vergelitos
2000 El Original2001 Te he prometido2001 16 Super Exitos2001 Loco2001 Homanje A Chalino Sanchez2002 Ranchero y mucho más2003 Sigo Siendo Original2004 Amor de Estudiante2005 Regresa Con 100% Norteño
2006 Sigo En La Jugada
2007 Aqui Estoy de Nuevo
2007 Tu Recuerdo
2008 Epoca Dorada
2010 La Desvelada

References

Year of birth missing (living people)
Living people
Singers from Los Angeles
American norteño musicians
American musicians of Mexican descent
American male singers
Hispanic and Latino American musicians